The French Archaeological Delegation in Afghanistan ( (DAFA)) was created in France in 1922 at the request of the Afghan government and King Amanullah Khan to commence archaeological studies in Afghanistan. After a break in research during the Second World War, work resumed around 1946-47, until it was closed by the pro-Soviet Afghan government on December 15, 1982. Some notable 20th century French archaeologists who were part of the delegation include Jules Barthoux, Daniel Schlumberger, and Paul Bernard.

In 2002, in agreement with the Afghan authorities, the Ministry of Foreign Affairs decided to reopen and restart the activities of DAFA in Afghanistan. DAFA's new mission is first of all to develop knowledge of Afghanistan's past, in the framework of French-Afghan archaeological operations. These operations consist of the continuation of the inventory of archaeological remains (prospecting, surveys, etc. ), as well as the conduct of archaeological excavations within the framework of well-defined scientific programs or rescue requirements, which are essentially related to the intensive looting of sites. Philippe Marquis is the current director of the delegation. The archaeological discoveries and finds have contributed to the artifacts located in the National Museum of Afghanistan. They have a base in Mazar-i-Sharif.

DAFA belongs to the network of 27 French research institutes abroad of the Ministry of Foreign Affairs.

Archaeological works 

 1923–1925: Works in Bactra
 1924: Excavations of Païtava (Begram)
 1925: Excavations of Begram (Jules Barthoux mission)
 1926: Survey in Bactria and first works in Hadda
 1927–1928: Excavations of Hadda (Barthoux)
 1929: Works in Bamyan
 1933: Excavations of Tepe Marandjan (Kabul Province)
 1934: Excavations of Khair Khane
 1936: Works in Sistan
 1936–1937: Excavations of Bagram
 1937: Excavations of Fondukistan (Parwan Province)
 1937: Shotarak excavations in Sistan and Balochistan Province.
 1947: Works in Bactra (by Daniel Schlumberger)
 1949–1951: Excavations of Lashkari Bazar (by Schlumberger)
 1951–1959: Excavation of the prehistoric site of Mundigak
 1952–1961: Excavations of Surkh Kotal (by Schlumberger)
 1957: Discovery of the site of the Minaret of Jam
 1957: Work in the Foladi Valley
 ?–1963: Excavations of Kohna Masdjid
 1963–1965: Excavations of the monastery of Gul Dara
 1963: Excavations of Shakh Tepe
 1964: Surveys at Ai-Khanoum
 1965–1978: Excavations of the site of Ai-Khanoum (by Paul Bernard)
 1974–1976: Surveys of the plain of Ai-Khanoum
 1976–1978; Surveys of Upper Tokharestan
 1976–1978: Excavations of Shortughai
 2004–2007: Excavations of Bactra (Balkh)
 2005: Excavations of Al-Ghata
 2005–2007: Franco-German works at Herat
 2005–2007: Works on the mosque of Haji Piyada.
 2010–2014: Excavations in Mes Aynak
 2014–2017: Work in Bamyan

Directors 
The following list is of the directors of the French archaeological delegation.

 1922–1945: Alfred Foucher
 1934–1941: Joseph Hackin
 1941–1942: Roman Girshman
 1946–1964: Daniel Schlumberger
 1965–1980: Paul Bernard
 1980–1982: Jean-Claude Gardin
 2002–2006: Roland Besenval
 2006–2014: Philippe Marquis
 2014–2018: Julio Bendezu-Sarmiento
 2018–present: Philippe Marquis

Sources and external links 

 The opening of the DAFA in Afghanistan (1922-1982) by P. Bernard at the site of l'Académie des Inscriptions et Belles Lettres.
 The DAFA on the website of Musée Guimet (Paris, France).
 Official website of DAFA

References

Archaeology of Afghanistan
French archaeologists
Afghanistan–France relations

See also
 Bernard, Paul: « L'oeuvre de la DAFA en Afghanistan (1922-1982) », CRAI 2002, p. 1287-1323.
 Olivier-Utard, Françoise: Politique et archéologie : histoire de la Délégation archéologique française en Afghanistan, 1922-1982, 2e édition, préface de Jean-Claude Gardin, Paris, éd. Recherche sur les civilisations, 2003, 423 p. (1re éd., Paris, De Boccard, 1997).
 Fenet, Annick: Documents d’archéologie militante. La mission Foucher en Afghanistan (1922-1925), Paris, 2010, 695 p. (Mémoires de l’Académie des Inscriptions et Belles-Lettres 42).
 Fenet, Annick: chapter 8 « The original ‘failure’? A century of French archaeology in Afghan Bactria », in R. Mairs (éd.), The Graeco-Bactrian and Indo-Greek world, Routledge, Londres, 2020, p. 142-170.